Karen Matheson OBE (born 11 February 1963) is a Scottish folk singer who frequently sings in Gaelic. She is the lead singer of the group Capercaillie and was a member of Dan Ar Braz's group L'Héritage des Celtes, with whom she often sang lead vocals, either alone or with Elaine Morgan. She and Morgan sang together on the Breton language song "Diwanit Bugale", the French entry in the Eurovision Song Contest 1996. She made a cameo appearance in the 1995 movie Rob Roy singing the song "Ailein duinn".

Biography
She grew up in the small village of Taynuilt in the region of Argyll, western Scotland. She was appointed an OBE in the 2006 New Year's honours list. Matheson also appeared as a guest musician on Spirit of the West's 1997 album Weights and Measures. Matheson performed a solo in Secret Garden's song "Prayer" in the 1999 album Dawn of a New Century. She is married to fellow Capercaillie member Donald Shaw, and they have a son.

On 2 February 2010, Matheson made an appearance on Celtic Woman 4, then on 16 October 2015, Karen Matheson released her fourth solo album, Urram, on Vertical Records. In support of the new album, Karen Matheson planned 7 shows in Scotland in December 2015 and January 2016, one show in January in Dublin, Ireland and 5 shows in the UK in February 2016 (as part of the Transatlantic Sessions).

On her official web site, Karen Matheson announced in March 2016 that she would embark on an 11-date Spring 2016 UK tour, visiting mainly Scotland, starting on 15 April 2016 in Perth, Scotland and ending on 18 June 2016 in Kirkcaldy, Scotland..

Karen Matheson announced on 1 July 2016 that she would perform one show on 19 July 2016 at Ionad Cois Locha, Dún Lúiche, Ireland, together with long-time friends and music partners Donald Shaw and Manus Lunny (both from Capercaillie), during the Trad Trathnona ("Trad Afternoon"), County Donegal's Summer of traditional Sessions (to occur each Tuesday in July & August).

After performing two shows on 26 & 28 August 2016 at the Shrewsbury Folk Festival, Karen Matheson would embark on a 9-date Autumn 2016 UK tour due to start on 15 September at the Beacon Arts Centre in Greenock, UK and to end on 29 September at Bush Hall in London, UK.

On 12 February 2021, Karen Matheson released her fifth solo album.

On 12th September 2022, Karen Matheson sang a Gaelic psalm at the Service of Thanksgiving for the late Queen Elizabeth II, at St. Giles Cathedral in Edinburgh, which was attended by HM King Charles III and other members of the Royal Family.  The Queen’s coffin lay in state at the cathedral during the service and until 5 pm the following day.

Solo discography
 The Dreaming Sea (1996)
 Time to Fall (2002)
 Downriver (2005)
 Urram (2015)
 Still Time (2021)

Notes

References

External links
 Karen Matheson's website
 BBC report of 2006 honours list, including Matheson's OBE

1963 births
Living people
Officers of the Order of the British Empire
Eurovision Song Contest entrants of 1996
Eurovision Song Contest entrants for France
21st-century Scottish women singers
Scottish folk musicians
People from Taynuilt
Scottish Gaelic singers
Capercaillie (band) members
Vertical Records artists
20th-century Scottish women singers